Nguyễn Thành Trung (born 1 January 1982) is a Vietnamese Paralympic swimmer.

References 

Swimmers at the 2012 Summer Paralympics
Vietnamese male swimmers
1982 births
Living people
Paralympic competitors for Vietnam
S5-classified Paralympic swimmers
Medalists at the 2018 Asian Para Games